The Acıbadem Healthcare Group (Turkish: Acıbadem Sağlık Grubu) is a Turkish healthcare institution, operating with 17,000 employees. It comprises 21 hospitals and 16 medical centers. The group consists of a network of general hospitals, medical centers, outpatient clinics, an ophthalmology center and various laboratories.

Besides its partnership with Istanbul International Hospital and International Etiler Outpatient Clinic, Acıbadem has hospitals in Eskişehir, Amsterdam, Bodrum, Maslak and Beşiktaş. It was founded in 1992 by Mehmet Ali Aydınlar and Armağan Özel, the latter having left the group in 2007. Aydınlar is still the CEO of the group. The largest shareholder of Acıbadem is IHH Healthcare.

It operates in 5 different countries.

Public offering

Acıbadem offered its shares in a public offering in 2000 and put the funds received towards new investments to increase its capacity. Today, Acıbadem is the only healthcare institution whose shares are traded on the Borsa Istanbul (BIST).

Services

Language interpretation 
Acıbadem Hospitals Group provides interpretation services, including accompanying appointments and translating patient education materials. Interpretation services provided in the following languages:

Advanced technology and information systems network
Acıbadem maintains a communications network between the Hospital Information Communication System in which all the medical records of patients are stored in Acıbadem Hospitals. Within or between the hospitals, Acıbadem employs an advanced Visual Transfer System.

Genetic diagnosis center
The Genetic Diagnosis Center offers genetic services.

Quality studies

Acıbadem has been accepted into the membership of the European Foundation for Quality Management (EFQM) and Kalder. ISO 9001 certificate is granted to the Acıbadem's Central Sterilization Units.

Joint Commission International accreditation
Joint Commission International (JCI) is an independent, international organization which determines the quality standards for healthcare. All institutions of the Acıbadem Healthcare Group have qualified to receive JCI accreditation.

Activities
Acıbadem organizes weekly and monthly scientific seminars and conferences with in-company and guest speakers. It offers a variety of community outreach programs such as health screenings, first aid courses, and healthcare talk shows.

International cooperation

Harvard Medical Cooperation
In 2003 Acıbadem registered to the services of Harvard Medical International (now Partners Harvard Medical International).

Contracted international insurance firms

Cooperation with Siemens AG and Massachusetts General Hospital
Under the framework of a cooperation agreement with the Siemens Medical Center, Acıbadem Hospital Kozyatağı has acquired three Tesla Intraoperative MR Equipment in its surgery room.

In addition to the Siemens agreement, Acıbadem Healthcare Group is entering into a cooperation with Massachusetts General Hospital.

Labmed Cooperation
In 2004, Acıbadem Healthcare Group signed a cooperation agreement with Labmed Dortmund GmbH, who had been active in Germany for 25 years.

See also 
Acıbadem University
Acıbadem University School of Medicine

References

External links 
 Official Website 

Health care companies of Turkey
Health care companies established in 1992
Companies listed on the Istanbul Stock Exchange
Turkish brands
IHH Healthcare
Turkish companies established in 1992